Lick Skillet is an unincorporated community in Decatur County, Tennessee, United States. Lick Skillet is located on Tennessee State Route 114 southeast of Scotts Hill.

References

Unincorporated communities in Decatur County, Tennessee
Unincorporated communities in Tennessee